Silvia Blair Trujillo is a Colombian scientist, known for her research on antimalarial compounds found in traditional plants from her country. During her research career, Blair has received various awards and recognitions, such as the Héctor Abad Gómez Medal to merits in Public Health in 1992, an honorable mention in the area of Basic Experimental Sciences in 2000, a Francisco José de Caldas Medal for University Excellence in 2008, and was named Emeritus Professor of the University of Antioquia in 2017.

Career 

Silvia Blair studied medicine at the University of Antioquia, graduating in 1974. In 2002, she enrolled at the National University of Colombia in Medellín, where she got a master's degree in science history and philosophy.

Her work is mainly linked to the Universidad de Antioquia, where she has been a teacher and researcher since the 1970s. Her areas of research have focused mainly on malaria and its treatment with Colombian traditional plants. In 1990 she founded the Malaria Group at the university, which was the first to report on cases of Plasmodium ovale (a rare species in Colombia) and human Babesiosis (disease transmitted by ticks).

Together with her research group, Silvia Blair travelled to different regions of Colombia such as the Pacific Coast, Urabá Antioqueño and the Bajo Cauca, to collect data on the plants used by locals to treat malaria. They reported species such as Solanum nudum and Austroeupatorium inulifolium as effective treatments for this disease.

Awards and recognitions 
 1992 – "Héctor Abad Gómez" Medal for Merits in Public Health, by the Government of Antioquia.
 1993 – Distinction to a teacher's work, by the University of Antioquia.
 1998 – Honorable Mention for professional, scientific and research work, Asociación Médica Sindical de Colombia.
 2000 – Honorable Mention in the area of Basic Experimental Sciences, by the National Academy of Medicine (Colombia).
 2000 – Mention of Recognition for Research, by the School of Microbiology of the University of Antioquia.
 2007 – Honorable Mention in Exact, Physical and Natural Sciences, by the Alejandro Ángel Escobar Foundation.
 2008 – "Francisco José de Caldas" Medal for University Excellence, by the University of Antioquia.
 2009 – Female Merit Medal for contributions to science, by the Alcaldía de Medellín (Town Hall).
 2013 – Distinction to a life of dedication to research, by the Alcaldía de Medellín (Town Hall).
 2016 – Emeritus researcher of Colciencias (Administrative Department for Science, Technology and Innovation)
 2017 – Emeritus professor, University of Antioquia.

Selected publications

Journal articles 
 Quintero J., Siqueira A., Tobón A., Blair S., Moreno A., Arévalo-Herrera M., Lacerda M., Valencia S. Malaria-related anaemia: A Latin American perspective. 2011. Memórias do Instituto Oswaldo Cruz; 106(1): 91–104. DOI: 10.1590/S0074-02762011000900012
 Blair-Trujillo, S., Lacharme-Lora, L.,  and  Carmona-Fonseca, J. 1998. Resistance of Plasmodium falciparum to Antimalarial Drugs in Zaragoza (Antioquia, Colombia). Mem. Inst. Oswaldo Cruz [online]; 97(3): 401–406. DOI: 10.1590/S0074-02762002000300022.
 Piñeros-Jiménez J.G., Álvarez G., Tobón A., Arboleda M., Carrero, S., Blair, S. 2011. Congenital malaria in Urabá, Colombia. Malaria Journal; 10, 239. DOI: 10.1186/1475-2875-10-239

Books 
 1991 – Plantas Antimaláricas, una revisión bibliográfica. .
 2005 – Plantas Antimaláricas de la Costa Pacífica Colombiana. .

Book chapters 
 1997 – Búsqueda de antimaláricos a partir de plantas medicinales.
 1999 – Resistencia a los antimaláricos.
 2008 – Malaria Gestacional, Obstetricia y Ginecología. .
 2014 – Malaria, Enfermedades Infecciosas de Homo sapiens. .
 2014 – Babesia spp, Enfermedades Infecciosas de Homo sapiens. .

References

External links 
 

Year of birth missing (living people)
Living people
Colombian medical researchers
Academic staff of the University of Antioquia
University of Antioquia alumni
National University of Colombia alumni
Malariologists